The Wisconsin Association of Independent Colleges and Universities (WAICU) is the official organization of Wisconsin's private, nonprofit (or independent) institutions of higher learning and their more than 56,000 students. It is headquartered in Madison, Wisconsin, was founded in 1961 and is recognized under state law. Each WAICU member is a nonprofit, fully accredited, four-year baccalaureate and/or graduate institution. The presidents of these institutions lead WAICU as its board of directors.

Programs and services 
 Policies: WAICU advocates for public policies that support the member institutions
 Accessibility: WAICU implements outreach initiatives that advance the affordability and accessibility of private, nonprofit colleges and universities in Wisconsin.
 Collaboration: WAICU organizes cost-saving collaborations such as joint purchases, insurance programs, and service offers.
 Involvement: Over 30 groups meet under the WAICU umbrella. The groups provide advice to the presidents (the Board) and to WAICU staff on programs and policies, share best practices, vet new opportunities, and provide personal and professional support to peers.
 Scholarships/Internships: WAICU seeks private philanthropic support for scholarships and internships for students and currently administers scholarships funded through WAICU endowments or through gifts.
 Workforce initiatives: WAICU works with career directors at member institutions to create and promote career, internship, and graduate school opportunities for students that meet their professional and educational goals.
 Research: WAICU is the state coordinator for the federal Integrated Postsecondary Education Data System or IPEDS (for private, nonprofit colleges) and operates the WAICU Longitudinal Data System.

Members 
WAICU members include: 
Alverno College 
Bellin College
Beloit College
Cardinal Stritch University
Carroll University 
Carthage College 
Concordia University Wisconsin
Edgewood College 
Herzing University 
Holy Family College
Lakeland University 
Lawrence University 
Marian University 
Marquette University 
Medical College of Wisconsin
Milwaukee Institute of Art and Design 
Milwaukee School of Engineering
Mount Mary University 
Nashotah House 
Northland College
Ripon College
St. Norbert College
Viterbo University 
Wisconsin Lutheran College

References

External links

WAICU groups

1961 establishments in Wisconsin
College and university associations and consortia in the United States
Education in Wisconsin
Organizations based in Madison, Wisconsin
Organizations established in 1961